Francisco Santos da Silva Júnior (born 18 January 1992) is a Bissau-Guinean professional footballer who plays as a midfielder for Liga I side Sepsi OSK. He represented Portugal internationally at under-19 and under-21 level, before being called up to the Guinea-Bissau senior team in 2017.

Originally from Guinea-Bissau, he was signed by Portuguese side Benfica whilst with Benfica de Bissau in 2007. He signed with English club Everton in February 2012, who loaned him out to Vitesse Arnhem, Strømsgodset, Port Vale, and Wigan Athletic. He joined Strømsgodset on a free transfer in February 2016 and was an unused substitute in the 2018 Norwegian Football Cup final. After two seasons, he joined Vendsyssel FF (Denmark) in December 2018. He spent the 2019–20 season with Israeli club Hapoel Haifa and then joined Romanian club Gaz Metan Mediaș in October 2020. He switched to Sepsi OSK in May 2022.

Club career

Early career
Júnior started his club career in Bissau with Sport Bissau e Benfica in Guinea-Bissau at youth level, he was spotted by talent scouts from FC Porto and Sporting CP but soon transferred to Benfica. His professional career began with Benfica in 2008, and he was contracted to the club until 2013 as there was a clause in the contract that automatically converted Júnior's youth contract into a professional contract.

Júnior was loaned to U.D. Leiria in 2011 but never showed up to play for Leiria, and it was found that the player had been training with Manchester City unbeknownst to Benfica. Benfica's president Luís Filipe Vieira told Manchester City to return the player to Benfica and sent the English club a plane ticket for Júnior's return. Vieira also threatened to report Manchester City to FIFA. In July 2011, Manchester-based media reported that Júnior was on trial with Manchester City, playing with their Development XI team in a friendly against Altrincham. Guinea-Bissauan sports agent Catió Balde and Anglo-Iranian lawyer Kia Joorabchian intervened and Manchester City were forced to release the player. Manchester City compensated Benfica with €1.5million.

Everton
In February 2012, Júnior signed professional terms with Everton having signed on a free transfer. In an interview with Guinea-Bissauan website Bola na Bantaba, Júnior stated that he signed for Everton because he "was tired of the impasse between Benfica and Manchester City and businessmen who wanted to win more than they should". He made his debut for the "Toffees" under David Moyes in a 2–1 League Cup defeat to Leeds United at Elland Road; he was taken off for Phil Neville at half-time.

On 1 September 2013, Júnior signed with Dutch Eredivisie side Vitesse Arnhem, in a season-long loan deal. This loan deal was later cancelled due to a knee injury, and a new five-month loan deal with Norwegian Tippeliga side Strømsgodset was signed in February 2014. The loan deal was later extended by one month, and expired in August. In December 2014 he began training with Scottish Premier League leaders Celtic under Ronny Deila, his former manager at Strømsgodset. On 26 March 2015, Júnior joined League One side Port Vale on loan until the end of the 2014–15 season. "Valiants" manager Rob Page said that "I'd like to thank Roberto Martínez for his co-operation with getting this deal over the line." He started away at Leyton Orient two days later, before being taken off for Sam Johnson after goalkeeper Chris Neal got sent off on 54 minutes. This proved to be his only appearance for the club as he picked up an injury and was ruled out for the rest of the campaign.

He returned to League One with newly relegated Wigan Athletic after joining on an initial one-month loan in July 2015. He made his debut for the "Latics" on 8 August in a 2–0 defeat to Coventry City at the Ricoh Arena. His loan was extended until 16 January after being described as a "revelation" by manager Gary Caldwell. However, he was forced to return to Everton in December for treatment on a long-standing groin problem.

Strømsgodset
In February 2016, he signed a two-year contract with Norwegian Tippeligaen club Strømsgodset. He scored one goal in 24 appearances in the 2016 season, as the club posted an eighth-place finish. He played 29 of the club's 30 league games in the 2017 season as Strømsgodset finished in fourth place, missing out on a UEFA Europa League qualification place by a single point. Strømsgodset reached the Norwegian Football Cup final, however he was not selected by head coach Bjørn Petter Ingebretsen and was instead an unused substitute in what finished as 4–1 defeat to Rosenborg at the Ullevaal Stadion.

Vendsyssel
On 14 December 2018, Júnior signed a contract with Danish Superligaen club Vendsyssel to keep him at the Hjørring Stadium until summer 2021. Jens Berthel Askou's VFF finished in the relegation play-off places at the end of the 2018–19 season and then lost their top-flight status with a 4–3 aggregate defeat to Lyngby.

Hapoel Haifa
Júnior joined Israeli Premier League side Hapoel Haifa in August 2019, signing a contract to run for one season with the option of a second; he said that Nir Bitton recommended he find a club in Israel. Haim Silvas's "Sharks" were in sixth-place when the 2019–20 season was curtailed due to the COVID-19 pandemic in Israel, with Júnior having made 28 appearances at the Sammy Ofer Stadium.

Romania
On 12 October 2020, Júnior signed a two-year contract with Romanian Liga I club Gaz Metan Mediaș. He made 24 appearances in the 2020–21 season and played 23 games in the 2021–22 campaign, with the club being relegated in summer 2022 after being deducted 42 points due to financial reasons. He remained in Liga I however, after signing with Sepsi OSK in May 2022.

International career
Júnior was called up for Portugal under-19 team in January 2011 for the four-team round-robin friendly La Manga Club tournament. His debut came against Slovakia, having replaced Rúben Pinto in the 73rd minute. He came on as a substitute in the 55th minute in the game against Norway and he helped Portugal retain their title, starting in the 3–1 win over Sweden in the tournament's final game. After leaving Benfica he rejected the chance to join the Portuguese under-20 team and told Guinea-Bissaun media in June 2012 that he wants to represent Guinea-Bissau. He was called up by the Guinea-Bissau national team in February 2012 to face Cameroon in the 2013 Africa Cup of Nations qualification campaign, but did not receive notification in time. In October 2012, he played for Portugal's under 21 side in a friendly against Ukraine.

He was selected by Baciro Candé in the Guinea-Bissau squad for the 2017 Africa Cup of Nations. He made his debut on the opening match of the tournament, in a 1–1 draw with hosts Gabon on 14 January 2017. He announced his retirement from international football on 25 March 2019.

Career statistics

International

Honours
Strømsgodset
Norwegian Football Cup runner-up: 2018

Sepsi OSK
Supercupa României: 2022

References

External links

1992 births
Living people
Sportspeople from Bissau
Bissau-Guinean footballers
Guinea-Bissau international footballers
Portuguese footballers
Portugal youth international footballers
Portugal under-21 international footballers
Bissau-Guinean emigrants to Portugal
Portuguese sportspeople of Bissau-Guinean descent
Association football midfielders
Everton F.C. players
SBV Vitesse players
Strømsgodset Toppfotball players
Port Vale F.C. players
Wigan Athletic F.C. players
Vendsyssel FF players
Hapoel Haifa F.C. players
CS Gaz Metan Mediaș players
Sepsi OSK Sfântu Gheorghe players
Eredivisie players
Eliteserien players
English Football League players
Danish Superliga players
Israeli Premier League players
Liga I players
2017 Africa Cup of Nations players
Bissau-Guinean expatriate footballers
Portuguese expatriate footballers
Bissau-Guinean expatriate sportspeople in England
Portuguese expatriate sportspeople in England
Expatriate footballers in England
Bissau-Guinean expatriate sportspeople in the Netherlands
Portuguese expatriate sportspeople in the Netherlands
Expatriate footballers in the Netherlands
Bissau-Guinean expatriate sportspeople in Norway
Portuguese expatriate sportspeople in Norway
Expatriate footballers in Norway
Bissau-Guinean expatriate sportspeople in Denmark
Portuguese expatriate sportspeople in Denmark
Expatriate men's footballers in Denmark
Bissau-Guinean expatriate sportspeople in Israel
Portuguese expatriate sportspeople in Israel
Expatriate footballers in Israel
Bissau-Guinean expatriate sportspeople in Romania
Portuguese expatriate sportspeople in Romania
Expatriate footballers in Romania